is a Japanese former footballer.

Career statistics

Club

Notes

Managerial statistics

References

External links

1972 births
Living people
Japanese footballers
Osaka University of Commerce alumni
Japan Football League players
Gamba Osaka players
J3 League managers
Vanraure Hachinohe managers
Japanese football managers
Association football midfielders